Clint King (born August 26, 1995) is an American professional stock car racing driver. He has raced in the NASCAR Xfinity Series, ARCA Racing Series and K&N Pro Series East.

Racing career
King grew up racing late models, scoring a victory in the UARA-Stars series at Kingsport Speedway. After running NASCAR, he competed in the Southeast Super Truck Series, winning the 2019 SSTS championship.

ARCA Racing Series
Debuting in the ARCA Racing Series in 2011, King won the pole for his first race with Venturini Motorsports. He finished third in that race, but won the pole in his second career start too. He started three races in 2011 with a best finish of third in his first race, at Madison International Speedway. King expanded his schedule to six races in 2012, not winning any poles but finishing out of the top ten only once. His only start in 2013 was a seventh at Berlin Raceway. On January 9, 2017, Lira Motorsports announced that King would drive the Lucas Oil Complete Engine Treatment 200 at Daytona International Speedway.

K&N Pro Series East
MacDonald Motorsports gave King his first ride in the K&N Pro Series East in 2013, where he finished 16th. In 2014, King ran four races for his family team with a best finish of 11th.

Xfinity Series
King broke into the NASCAR Xfinity Series in 2016, driving the No. 15 Ford for B. J. McLeod Motorsports at Richmond International Raceway. King finished 30th that first race, but then improved to 26th in his other two outings, at Charlotte Motor Speedway and Texas Motor Speedway. After the 2016 season, team owner B. J. McLeod hinted at King running full-time in 2017 contingent on sponsorship. He is rumored to run the 2017 season opener at Daytona International Speedway. He ran the first 2 races of the season in the No. 78 Chevy, then McLeod went back to it since then several other drivers have been in the No. 78.

Personal life 
King is the manager of Warehouse Design who sponsored him in his career.

Motorsports career results

NASCAR
(key) (Bold – Pole position awarded by qualifying time. Italics – Pole position earned by points standings or practice time. * – Most laps led.)

Xfinity Series

K&N Pro Series East

ARCA Racing Series
(key) (Bold – Pole position awarded by qualifying time. Italics – Pole position earned by points standings or practice time. * – Most laps led.)

 Season still in progress
 Ineligible for series points

References

External links
 

NASCAR drivers
Living people
1995 births
People from Denton, North Carolina
Racing drivers from North Carolina
ARCA Menards Series drivers